Alkalihalobacillus murimartini is a bacterium from the genus of Alkalihalobacillus which has been isolated from the sponge Plakortis simplex from the Sula-Ridge from the Norwegian Sea.

References

Bacillaceae
Bacteria described in 2007